Jean-Marie Hunebelle, known professionally as Jean Halain, born 14 January 1920 in Paris, died 14 September 2000 in Juvisy-sur-Orge, was a film screenwriter.

Son of André Hunebelle, he was a scriptwriter and screenwriter of numerous films of Louis de Funès.

Screenwriter 

 1948 : Métier de fous, directed by André Hunebelle
 1949 : Millionaires for One Day, of André Hunebelle
 1950 : La Rue sans loi, of Maurice Labro
 1952 : My Husband Is Marvelous, of André Hunebelle
 1954 : Cadet-Rousselle, of André Hunebelle
 1955 : L'Impossible Monsieur Pipelet, of André Hunebelle
 1956 : Casinos de Paris, of André Hunebelle
 1956 : Thirteen at the Table, of André Hunebelle
 1958 : Taxi, roulotte et corrida, of André Hunebelle
 1959 : Le Bossu, of André Hunebelle
 1960 : L'assassin est dans l'annuaire, of Léo Joannon
 1960 : Le Capitan, of André Hunebelle
 1961 : Le Comte de Monte-Cristo', of Claude Autant-Lara
 1961 : Le Miracle des loups, of André Hunebelle
 1962 : Méfiez-vous, mesdames, of André Hunebelle
 1962 : Les Mystères de Paris, of André Hunebelle
 1964 : Fantômas, of André Hunebelle
 1964 : Le Tigre aime la chair fraîche, of Claude Chabrol
 1965 : Furia à Bahia pour OSS 117, of André Hunebelle
 1965 : Fantômas se déchaîne, of André Hunebelle
 1966 : Le Grand Restaurant, of Jacques Besnard
 1967 : Oscar, of Edouard Molinaro
 1967 : Fantômas contre Scotland Yard, of André Hunebelle
 1967 : Le Fou du labo 4, of Jacques Besnard
 1968 : Sous le signe de Monte-Cristo, of André Hunebelle
 1969 : Hibernatus, of Edouard Molinaro
 1970 : L'Homme orchestre, of Serge Korber
 1970 : Sur un arbre perché, of Serge Korber
 1973 : Les Quatre Charlots mousquetaires, of André Hunebelle
 1974 : A nous quatre, cardinal, de André Hunebelle
 1974 : C'est pas parce qu'on a rien à dire qu'il faut fermer sa gueule, of Jacques Besnard
 1976 : The Porter from Maxim's, of Claude Vital
 1977 : Le Maestro, of Claude Vital
 1977 : Gloria, of Claude Autant-Lara
 1978 : Ça fait tilt, of André Hunebelle
 1980 : L'Avare, of Jean Girault and Louis de Funès
 1981 : La Soupe aux choux'', of Jean Girault

External links 

 

Writers from Paris
1920 births
2000 deaths
French male screenwriters
20th-century French screenwriters
20th-century French male writers